Lepidoteuthis grimaldii, also known as the Grimaldi scaled squid, is a large squid growing to 1 m in mantle length. It is named after the Grimaldi family, reigning house of Monaco. Prince Albert I of Monaco was an amateur teuthologist who pioneered the study of deep sea squids by collecting the 'precious regurgitations' of sperm whales. The Grimaldi scaled squid was first collected from the stomach contents of a sperm whale. It is a widely distributed species in tropical and subtropical areas of the North and South Atlantic, the southern Indian Ocean and the Pacific Ocean, where it has been recorded off Japan and in the west Pacific.

See also
Cephalopod size

References

External links

Tree of Life web project: Lepidoteuthis grimaldii
 TONMO.com article:  Unique hooks in the male scaled squid Lepidoteuthis grimaldii Joubin, 1895

Squid
Molluscs described in 1895